The 1928 Newfoundland general election was held on 2 June 1928 to elect members of the 27th General Assembly of Newfoundland in the Dominion of Newfoundland. The Liberal Party led by Richard Squires defeated the Conservative Party led by Frederick C. Alderdice and formed the government with the support of Fishermen's Protective Union members. Legislation had been introduced so that persons named to the Executive Council were no longer required to run for reelection. Helena E. Squires, elected in a 1930 by-election, became the first woman elected to the Newfoundland assembly.

In April 1925, women over the age of 25 had been granted the right to vote; in the 1928 general election, 90 per cent of women eligible to vote cast a ballot.

Results by party 

* As Liberal-Progressives

Elected members

(Fishermen's Protective Union MHAs are listed as Liberals)

 Bay de Verde
 John C. Puddester Conservative
 Bay Roberts
 John Parsons Liberal
 Bell Island
 Joseph M. Greene Liberal
 Bonavista Centre
 J. H. Scammell Liberal
 Bonavista East
 William F. Coaker Liberal
 Bonavista North
 Robert G. Winsor Liberal
 Nathan G. Winsor Liberal, elected in 1930
 Bonavista South
 Herman W. Quinton Conservative
 Burgeo
 Walter M. Chambers Conservative
 Arthur Barnes Liberal, shortly after election
 Burin East
 James A. Winter Conservative
 Burin West
 H. B. C. Lake Liberal
 Carbonear
 James Moore Conservative
 Ferryland
 Peter J. Cashin Liberal
 Fogo
 Richard Hibbs Liberal
 Fortune Bay
 Harris M. Mosdell Liberal
 Grand Falls
 William Earle Liberal
 Green Bay
 Roland G. Starkes Liberal
 Harbour Grace
 Frank C. Archibald Liberal
 Harbour Main
 Philip J. Lewis Liberal
 Albert J. Walsh Liberal (speaker)
 Hermitage
 Philip Fudge Liberal
 Humber
 Richard A. Squires Liberal
 Lewisporte
 George F. Grimes Liberal
 Helena E. Squires Liberal, elected in 1930
 Placentia East
 L. Edward Emerson Conservative
 Placentia West
 Michael S. Sullivan Conservative
 Leo J. Murphy Liberal, elected in 1930
 Port au Port
 William H. Abbott Conservative
 Port de Grave
 R. J. Smith Liberal
 St. Barbe
 Walter R. Skanes Liberal
 St. George's
 Joseph F. Downey Liberal
 St. John's City East
 Frederick C. Alderdice Conservative
 Gerald G. Byrne Conservative
 St. John's City West
 Alexander Campbell Liberal
 J. M. Fitzgibbon Liberal
 St. John's East Extern
 John M. Tobin Conservative
 St. John's West Extern
 Frank Bennett Conservative
 St. Mary's
 James J. Bindon Liberal
 Trinity Centre
 F. Gordon Bradley Liberal
 Trinity North
 William W. Halfyard Liberal
 Trinity South
 Edwin J. Godden Liberal
 Twillingate
 Kenneth M. Brown Liberal
 White Bay
 J. A. Strong Liberal

References 
 

1928
1928 elections in North America
1928 elections in Canada
Politics of the Dominion of Newfoundland
1928 in Newfoundland
June 1928 events